Belton may refer to:

People
 Belton Richard (1939–2017), Cajun musician
 Belton (surname), various people

Places

Canada
 Belton, Ontario

United Kingdom
 Belton, North Lincolnshire, Lincolnshire
 Belton, South Kesteven, Lincolnshire
 Belton House, a National Trust property
 RAF Belton Park
 Belton, Leicestershire
 Belton, Norfolk
 Belton-in-Rutland

United States
 Belton, Kentucky
 Belton, Missouri
 Belton, Montana, known today as West Glacier
 Belton, South Carolina
 Belton, Texas

Other
 Belton v. Gebhart, one of the cases which were combined into Brown v. Board of Education
 New York v. Belton, a 1981 United States Supreme Court cases concerning search and seizure
 HMS Belton (M1199)

See also
Bellton, West Virginia, United States